"Look Who's Talking!" is a song by Sweden-based musician and producer Dr. Alban, featuring vocals from Swedish singer Nana Hedin. It was released in February 1994 as the first single from his third studio album, Look Who's Talking (1994), and reached number-one in Denmark and Finland. The song became a top-10 in almost all other European countries, except France and the UK. It entered the Eurochart Hot 100 on 12 March 1994 at number 61 and went on to peak at the second position four weeks later. In the US, it peaked at number 11 on Billboard's Hot Dance Club Play chart. In Zimbabwe, the single peaked at number 10. A CD maxi containing four remixes was also released, particularly devoted to the dance floors.

Critical reception
AllMusic editor John Bush noted that Dr. Alban "uses elements of worldbeat to mix up" the song. Larry Flick from Billboard felt that it follows the Euro-disco/world-beat thread" of 1993's "It's My Life", "sewing in several intriguing new creative colors." Pan-European magazine Music & Media wrote that "his instantly recognisable coffee brown rap sets the bush doctor apart from the rest in the Euro dance field with standard synth riffs and one-line choruses sung by anonymous ladies." Alan Jones from Music Week declared it as a "simple and maddeningly familiar song [that] relies on a hooky refrain, while Alban adds his odd African-accented rap in a style reminiscent of his early "No Coke" single." 

Wendi Cermak from The Network Forty said it as "a must-purchase". A reviewer from Reading Evening Post described it as "an inane but insistent tune." James Hamilton from the RM Dance Update called it a "Afro-ish choppily chanted and girls chorused breezy Euro romper". Pete Stanton from Smash Hits gave "Look Who's Talking!" two out of five, noting "its pacy Euro beats and singalong chorus". James Hunter from Vibe declared it as "superefficient disco glued down with dancehall toasting, answered by streaming female vocals."

Chart performance
The song made an impact on the chart in Europe, becoming a major hit in most countries. It peaked at number-one in Denmark and Finland, and was a top-five hit in Austria, Belgium, Germany, the Netherlands, Norway, Spain and Sweden. In the two latter, it reached number two. In addition, the single reached the top 20 in France, Ireland and Italy. In the UK, it only reached the top 60, peaking at number 55 on 20 March, but on the UK Dance Singles Chart, it hit number 20. On the Eurochart Hot 100, "Look Who's Talking!" reached the top five, peaking at number three. Outside Europe, it was quite successful in Israel and Zimbabwe, peaking at number four and ten. In the US, the song charted at number 11 on the Billboard Hot Dance Club Play chart and number 50 on the Billboard Hot Dance Music/Maxi-Singles Sales chart.

Airplay
"Look Who's Talking!" entered the European airplay chart Border Breakers at number nine on 12 March 1994 due to crossover airplay in West Central-, North West-, North- and South-Europe. It peaked at number four on 26 March.

Music video
The accompanying music video for "Look Who's Talking!" was directed by Jonathan Bate. In the video, Dr. Alban performs the song at a movie set, surrounded by four ladies singing the choruses. It doesn't feature Nana Hedin. The video also features Asian shadow theatre figures and has a sepia tone. It received heavy rotation on MTV Europe and was A-listed on Germany's VIVA. Bate would also direct the videos for Dr. Alban's next two singles, "Away from Home" and "Let the Beat Go On".

Track listings

 12" single
"Look Who's Talking (Long Version) – 5:22
"Look Who's Talking (Stone's Clubmix) – 7:14
"Look Who's Talking (Short Version) – 3:13
"Look Who's Talking (Stone's Eurodub) – 6:16

 CD single
 "Look Who's Talking" (Short) – 3:13
 "Look Who's Talking" (Long) – 5:22

 CD maxi
 "Look Who's Talking" (Short) – 3:13
 "Look Who's Talking" (Long) – 5:22
 "Look Who's Talking" (Stone's Clubmix) – 7:14
 "Look Who's Talking" (Stone's Eurodub) – 6:16

 CD maxi - Remix
 "Look Who's Talking" (Lucky Version) – 5:50
 "Look Who's Talking" (Lucky Edit) – 3:29
 "Look Who's Talking" (Attitude Version) – 10:40
 "Look Who's Talking" (Rascal Instrumental) – 6:52

 CD maxi - UK release
 "Look Who's Talking" (Short) – 3:13
 "Look Who's Talking" (Stone's Radio) – 4:14
 "Look Who's Talking" (Long) – 5:22
 "Look Who's Talking" (Stone's Club Mix) – 7:14
 "It's My Life" (Album Version) – 4:00

Charts

Weekly charts

Year-end charts

Release history

References

1994 singles
1994 songs
Dr. Alban songs
English-language Swedish songs
Logic Records singles
Music videos directed by Jonathan Bate
Nana Hedin songs
Number-one singles in Denmark
Number-one singles in Finland
Songs written by Denniz Pop
Songs written by Dr. Alban